The 1992–93 season was Cardiff City F.C.'s 66th season in the Football League. They competed in the 22-team Division Three, then the fourth tier of English football, finishing first, winning promotion to Division Two.

Players
First team squad.

Table

Results by round

Fixtures and results

Third Division

Source

Coca-Cola Cup (League Cup)

FA Cup

UEFA Cup Winners Cup

Welsh Cup

Autoglass Trophy

Notes and references

Bibliography

 

 

 Welsh Football Data Archive

1992-93
Welsh football clubs 1992–93 season
1992–93 Football League Third Division by team